The men's 50 metre rifle three positions event at the 2019 European Games in Minsk, Belarus took place on 27 June at the Shooting Centre.

Schedule
All times are  local (UTC+3).

Records

Results

Qualification

Final

References

Women's 50 metre rifle three positions